
Coruto Lake or Caruta Lake is a lake in the Sur Lípez Province, Potosí Department, Bolivia. At an elevation of 4505 m, its surface area is 15.8 km².

References 

Lakes of Potosí Department